Wadworth is a brewery company founded in 1875 in Devizes, Wiltshire, England, best known for their 6X beer brand.

History
Wadworth & Co. was founded in 1875 when Henry Wadworth purchased the Northgate Brewery in Devizes.  It was not long before they exceeded their capacity at the Northgate Brewery and in 1885 they moved premises to a new facility close to their original site.  Since then, the brewer has been a major influence on the economy of Devizes and a major provider of ale in the south of England.

The present Northgate Brewery is a tower brewery opened in 1885.

Beers
While 6X is the brewer's best known beer, the company also produce other beers, including several seasonal ales.

Beers available throughout the year:

 6X  (4.1% abv on draught, 4.3% abv cans and bottles) 
 Henry's Original IPA  (3.6%abv)
 Horizon – Golden Ale  (4.0% abv)
 Bishop's Tipple – Golden ale, full flavoured  (5.0% abv on draught, 5.5% abv in bottle)
 Swordfish  – A stronger version of 6X with the addition of Pusser's Navy Rum  (5.0% abv)
 Corvus – A nitro keg stout available in 30L format with a chocolate & coffee taste and creamy head

Seasonal beers:

 St George & The Dragon – (March and April)
 Lily The Pink – a blend of golden beer and Angostura bitters
 Red, White & Brew – a hoppy golden beer brewed initially to commemorate the Jubilee and the Olympics (May–July)
 Farmers Glory – a traditional English ale (July and August, 4.7% abv)
 Malt & Hops – using fresh hops straight from the bine (September and October)
 Blunderbuss – a red autumn ale flavoured with elderberry (5.0% abv)
 Old Timer – winter ale (December and January)

6X
The "X" in 6X refers to a traditional grading system for strong beer; it was first brewed in 1923. In 2007, 6X won the Daily Telegraph and Cask Marque Best Of British Beer Award for Wales and the West Country. 6X is available in draught cask, keg, can and bottle formats.

Operations
Wadworths still use traditional shire horses to deliver their casked ale to local pubs in Devizes. The ale can be delivered in metal or wooden barrels.

The brewery owns four horses (Monty, Max and Archie and Sam) which are stabled at the brewery. As well as delivering ale, the horses compete in shows and events throughout the country. They are often featured in the local press and have featured in television programmes such as Countryfile.

Wadworth operate a Visitor Centre and gift shop at the brewery.  Tours of the brewery can be taken and may include a tutored tasting of the Wadworth range and visits to the shire horses and sign-writing shop.

See also
 British regional breweries using wooden casks

References

External links

British brands
Breweries in England
1875 establishments in England
Devizes
Tourist attractions in Wiltshire
Tower breweries
Food and drink companies established in 1875
British companies established in 1875